Sang-e Bil (also Romanized as Sang-e Bīl and Sang va Bīl) is a village in Poshtkuh Rural District, in the Central District of Ardal County, Chaharmahal and Bakhtiari Province, Iran. At the 2006 census, its population was 17, in 4 families.

References 

Populated places in Ardal County